Sisters in Law may refer to:

 Sibling-in-law, a person related to another by being the sibling of a spouse or the spouse of a sibling
 Sisters in Law (film), a 2005 documentary film
 Sisters in Law (book), a 2015 book by Linda R. Hirshman 
 "Sister in Law" (Everybody Loves Raymond episode), episode 13 of season 9
 Sisters-in-Law (TV series), a 2017 South Korean television series.